F. J. Brennan may refer to:

Francis Brennan (cardinal) (1894-1968), American Roman Catholic Cardinal
F. J. Brennan Catholic High School, Canadian high school